Puzhou or Pu Prefecture, also known as Hezhong Prefecture between 760 and 1369 (and briefly in 720) and Puzhou Prefecture between 1728 and 1912, was a zhou or fu (prefecture) in imperial China, centering on modern Yongji, Shanxi, China. It existed (intermittently) from 558 until 1912.

See also
Hedong Commandery

References
 

Prefectures of Later Han (Five Dynasties)
Prefectures of the Tang dynasty
Prefectures of the Sui dynasty
Prefectures of Later Tang
Prefectures of Later Liang (Five Dynasties)
Prefectures of Later Jin (Five Dynasties)
Prefectures of the Song dynasty
Former prefectures in Shanxi
Prefectures of Later Zhou
Prefectures of the Jin dynasty (1115–1234)
Prefectures of the Yuan dynasty
Subprefectures of the Ming dynasty
Prefectures of the Qing dynasty